The 2009 European U23 Judo Championships is an edition of the European U23 Judo Championships, organised by the European Judo Union. It was held in Antalya, Turkey from 20 to 22 November 2009.

Medal summary

Medal table

Men's events

Women's events

Source Results

References

External links
 

European U23 Judo Championships
 U23
European Championships, U23
Judo
European
Judo
Judo, European Championships U23